Driess Saddiki (born 9 August 1996) is a Dutch professional footballer who plays as a midfielder for Saudi Professional League club Abha.

Club career
Saddiki made his professional debut in the Eerste Divisie for Fortuna Sittard on 8 May 2015 in a game against RKC Waalwijk. On 16 May 2018, he signed a three-year contract with Eredivisie club Willem II.

On 27 June 2022, Willem II announced Saddiki's transfer to Umm Salal in Qatar.

On 6 February 2023, Saddiki joined Saudi Arabian club Abha.

Personal life
Born in the Netherlands, Saddiki is of Moroccan descent.

References

External links
 
 
 [https://www.vi.nl/spelers/driess-saddiki/carriere https://www.vi.nl/spelers/driess-saddiki/carriere

1996 births
Footballers from Venlo
Living people
Dutch footballers
Dutch sportspeople of Moroccan descent
Fortuna Sittard players
Willem II (football club) players
Umm Salal SC players
Abha Club players
Eredivisie players
Eerste Divisie players
Qatar Stars League players
Saudi Professional League players
Association football midfielders
Dutch expatriate footballers
Expatriate footballers in Qatar
Expatriate footballers in Saudi Arabia
Dutch expatriate sportspeople in Qatar
Dutch expatriate sportspeople in Saudi Arabia